Francis James Furey (February 22, 1905 – April 23, 1979) was an American prelate of the Roman Catholic Church. 

He served as auxiliary bishop of the Archdiocese of Philadelphia in Pennsylvania from 1960 to 1863, as bishop of the Diocese of San Diego in California from 1966 to 1969 and as archbishop of the Archdiocese of San Antonio in Texas from 1969 to 1979.

Biography

Early life 
The eldest of five children, Francis Furey was born on February 22, 1905, in Summit Hill, Pennsylvania, to John and Anna (née O'Donnell) Furey. After attending public schools in Coaldale, Pennsylvania, he graduated from St. Mary's High School in 1920 as valedictorian. Furey then attended St. Charles Borromeo Seminary in Overbrook, Pennsylvania, for four years.  He then traveled to Rome to enter the Pontifical Roman Seminary, from where he received a Doctor of Philosophy degree in 1926 and a Doctor of Sacred Theology degree in 1930.

Priesthood 
Furey was ordained to the priesthood by Cardinal Basilio Pompili on March 15, 1930.Following his return to Pennsylvania, he served as private secretary to Cardinal Dennis Dougherty. Furey was appointed in 1936 as president of Immaculata College in East Whiteland Township, Pennsylvania.  He left Immaculata College in 1946 to become rector of St. Charles Borromeo Seminary. He was named a domestic prelate in 1947. In 1958, Furey left his position as rector to became pastor of St. Helena's Parish in Philadelphia.

Auxiliary Bishop of Philadelphia 
On August 17, 1960, Furey was appointed as an auxiliary bishop of the Archdiocese of Philadelphia and titular bishop of Temnus by Pope John XXIII. He received his episcopal consecration on December 22, 1960, from Archbishop Egidio Vagnozzi, with Bishops Joseph McShea and Joseph McCormick serving as co-consecrators.

Coadjutor Bishop and Bishop of San Diego 
Pope Paul VI appointed Furey as coadjutor bishop of the Diocese of San Diego on July 21, 1963. After the death of Bishop Charles F. Buddy on March 5, 1966, Furey automatically succeeded him as bishop. He served on the administrative tribunal of the Second Vatican Council in Rome from 1962 to 1965.

Archbishop of San Antonio 
On May 23, 1969, Furey was appointed as the third archbishop of the Archdiocese of San Antonio by Paul VI. After his installation, Furey decided not to move into the large bishop's residence, choosing instead a two-room apartment in a poor part of the city.

Furey established one of the first diocesan commissions for Mexican American affairs in the United States, and promoted the candidacy in 1970 of Reverend Patrick Flores as the first Mexican American bishop in the country. Furey was an outspoken supporter of Communities Organized for Public Service, a community organizing group in San Antonio. He also supported the Farah strike (October 1973) and the lettuce boycotts of the Texas Farm Workers Union. He held various offices within the National Conference of Catholic Bishops, including chair of the Committee for the Campaign for Human Development. 

Furey was chaplain of the Texas State Council of the Knights of Columbus, bishop protector of the Catholic War Veterans of the U.S.A., and appointed by Texas Governor Preston Smith to the John F. Kennedy Memorial Commission. He was an honorary member of the United States Marine Corps, and received honorary degrees from La Salle College, St. Joseph College, Villanova University, St. John's University, Brooklyn, New York; Mount St. Mary's University, and Our Lady of the Lake University.

Death and legacy 
Francis Furey died of cancer in San Antonio on April 23,1979, at age 74.  He was buried in Holy Cross Cemetery in San Antonio.

References

5. Francis James Furey's Niece Dolores Fennell

1905 births
1979 deaths
St. Charles Borromeo Seminary alumni
Immaculata University people
People from Carbon County, Pennsylvania
20th-century Roman Catholic archbishops in the United States
Participants in the Second Vatican Council
Roman Catholic bishops of San Diego
Roman Catholic archbishops of San Antonio
Catholics from Pennsylvania